Forum checks were a form of hard currency in East Germany. From April 1979, all East Germans were required by law to convert any Deutsche Marks (and other western currencies) they possessed into Forum checks at a branch of the Staatsbank der DDR immediately. A Forum check mark was worth 1 West German Deutsche Mark, the smallest denomination was 50 Pfennigs and the highest was for 500 West German Deutsche Mark. Forum checks were accepted in Intershops as payment for western consumer goods and other products which were available in these shops only. Foreign citizens could use western currencies in these shops.

See also 

 Foreign exchange certificate
 Bon Towarowy PeKaO

External links  
  Neue Währung in den Intershops
 A complete gallery of the banknotes of the German Democratic Republic, including a section on Forum checks at Banknote Museum 

Economy of East Germany
Currencies of Germany